Gosling (previously known as Loudermilk) was an American rock band formed in Tri-Cities, Washington. The band was composed of Davey Ingersoll (vocals, guitar), Mark Watrous (guitar, later keyboards), Shane Middleton (bass) and Isaac Carpenter (drums, percussion). As Loudermilk, formed in 1995, the group released two albums; the independently released Man with Gun Kills Three! (1998) and then major label debut The Red Record (2002), and toured with Megadeth and Mötley Crüe. Loudermilk appeared in an episode of Dawson's Creek (Season 6, Episode 12) under the stylized name "LoudMilk" performing "Rock 'N' Roll & The Teenage Desperation" on stage. They also performed "Elekt" on the TV show Charmed.

The group later, in 2004, changed both their name and music style and were then known as Gosling. They went on to release a self titled EP, through The Control Group in 2004 and their final album, Here Is..., through V2, in 2006. They played shows with Velvet Revolver and Rose Hill Drive before eventually disbanding.

History

Loudermilk (1995–2004)

In 1995, friends Davey Ingersoll (vocals, guitar), Mark Watrous (guitar), Shane Middleton (bass) and Issac Carpenter (drums) formed the hard rock quartet Loudermilk in Tri-Cities, Washington. They released their own album, Man with Gun Kills Three!, independently in 1998. After hearing an unauthorized demo, American Recordings subsequently signed the group. Commenting on the demoes, Ingersoll stated that the demo was made just to get songs down and that "It was something [he] didn't even want people to hear". Despite touring with groups such as Mötley Crüe and Megadeth, they were dropped from the label. Speaking about the group being dropped from the label, Ingersoll stated:

DreamWorks Records signed them in early 2002. Several months later, they recorded and released their first official major label album, The Red Record.

Gosling (2004–2006)

In 2004, Loudermilk changed their name to Gosling, after changing their musical style, retaining all members with Watrous switching from guitar to keyboards. Influenced by the likes of Sunny Day Real Estate, The Smashing Pumpkins, Pink Floyd and Queen, they released the Gosling EP through The Control Group in August 2004. Earlier in the year, they supported Velvet Revolver at The Roxy Theatre in West Hollywood, California. They released their debut full-length Here Is... in 2006 through V2 and went on to tour with Rose Hill Drive.

A cover of David Bowie's "Cat People (Putting Out Fire)" was included on the soundtrack to the film Underworld: Evolution in 2006.

Post-Break up
Drummer Carpenter went on to perform with a number of groups such as The Exies, Ours, Seaspin and Black Lab among others. In 2009, became the drummer for Loaded, the band fronted by Velvet Revolver and former Guns N' Roses bassist Duff McKagan, replacing previous drummer Geoff Reading. In September 2010, the group completed the recording of their new album which was produced by Terry Date.

Guitar player and keyboardist Mark Watrous has since functioned as a studio musician and a touring member of Shudder To Think, The Raconteurs, The Shins, Brendan Benson, Karen Elson, The Greenhornes and Cory Chisel & The Wandering Sons. In 2010 he released a split 7-inch under his own name with Canadian singer/songwriter Hannah Georgas as well as a 7-inch with Brendan Benson as the fictional duo Well & Goode. He is now the frontman for the Nashville-based Earl Burrows.

Band members
Davey Ingersoll – vocals, guitar
Mark Watrous – guitar, keyboard, backing vocals
Shane Middleton – bass
Isaac Carpenter – drums, percussion, backing vocals

Discography

Videography
 "Mr. Skeleton Wings" (2006)
 "Stealing Stars" (2006)

References

External links

1995 establishments in Washington (state)
DreamWorks Records artists
Hard rock musical groups from Washington (state)
Musical groups established in 1995
Musical groups disestablished in 2006
People from Tri-Cities, Washington
V2 Records artists